Steffen Strait is a strait near Selapiu Island, generally between New Hanover and New Ireland.

References 

Straits of Papua New Guinea